In cricket, a five-wicket haul (also known as a "fifer") refers to a bowler taking five or more wickets in a single innings. This is regarded as a notable achievement, and  only 49 bowlers have taken 15 or more five-wicket hauls at international level in their cricketing careers. Ravichandran Ashwin  a right-arm off break bowler  is a Test, One Day International (ODI) and Twenty20 International (T20I) cricketer who represents the India national cricket team. In a 2016 interview, former Sri Lanka spinner Muttiah Muralitharan described Ashwin as the "best current Test spinner". , Ashwin has taken 32 five-wicket hauls in international cricket; he ranks ninth in the all-time list, and second among his countrymen.

Ashwin made his Test debut in November 2011 against the West Indies. He took nine wickets in the match, including a five-wicket haul in the second innings. India won the match and his performance earned him the man of the match honour. His career-best figures of seven wickets for 59 runs came against New Zealand in October 2016; in the process he also became the fifth bowler to take six five-wicket hauls against them. He has picked up ten or more wickets in a match on seven occasions. Ashwin made his ODI and T20I debuts in June 2010 against Sri Lanka and Zimbabwe, respectively, and is yet to take a five-wicket haul in both formats. His four wickets for 25 runs against the United Arab Emirates in the 2015 World Cup remain his best in ODIs, while his figures of four wickets for 8 runs against Sri Lanka are the fourth-best by an Indian in T20Is.

Key

Tests

Notes

References

Indian cricket lists
Ravichandran Ashwin